The Seram boobook (Ninox squamipila) is a species of owl in the family Strigidae. It is found on the Indonesian islands of Seram, Kelang and Ambon.  Its natural habitat is subtropical or tropical moist lowland forests. It is threatened by habitat loss.  It used to be considered a subspecies of the Moluccan boobook.

Taxonomy

The Seram boobook is part of a species complex that comprises four species. All four species used to be considered as part of a single species, the Moluccan boobook, which was classified under the scientific name Ninox squamipila used in a broader sense. 

The four species of Moluccan boobook currently recognised are:

 Ninox squamipila (Bonaparte, 1850) - Seram boobook - Seram Island in the southern Maluku Islands
 Ninox forbesi (PL Sclater, 1883) - Tanimbar boobook - Tanimbar Islands
 Ninox hypogramma (GR Gray, 1861) - Halmahera boobook - northern Maluku Islands of Halmahera, Ternate, and Bacan
 Ninox hantu (Wallace, 1863) - Buru boobook - Buru Island in the southern Maluku Islands

References

Norman, J.A., L. Christidis, M. Westerman, and F.A. Richard-Hall. 1998. Molecular data confirm the species status of the Christmas Island Hawk-Owl Ninox natalis. Emu 98: 197–208.
Rheindt, F.E., and R.O. Hutchinson. 2007. A photoshot odyssey through the confused avian taxonomy of Seram and Buru (southern Moluccas). BirdingASIA 7: 18–38.

Seram boobook
Birds of Seram
Seram boobook
Seram boobook